A Cyclops is a one-eyed monster in Greek mythology.

Cyclops or The Cyclops may also refer to:

Arts and entertainment

Literature
 Cyclops (play), by Euripides
 Cyclops (novel), a Dirk Pitt novel by Clive Cussler
 Cyclops (Marvel Comics), a Marvel Comics superhero
 Cyclops (magazine), a British underground comics magazine of the 1970s
 Cyclops, a comic poem by Philoxenus of Cythera
 Cyclops, an organization in David Brin's novel The Postman

Film and television
 The Cyclops (film), a 1957 American science fiction film
 Cyclops (1976 film), a Bulgarian film
 Cyclops (1982 film), a Croatian film
 Cyclops (1987 film), a Japanese science fiction horror film
 Cyclops (2008 film), an American fantasy film
 Cyclops, a character in the TV series Xiaolin Showdown
 Cyclops, a character in the TV series Mahou Sentai Magiranger
 Cyclops, the bus in the film The Big Bus

Games
 Cyclops (Dungeons & Dragons), a giant in the role-playing game Dungeons & Dragons
 Cyclops, a BattleMech in the Battletech universe
 Cyclops, a unit in the video game Halo Wars

Music
 Cyclops (album), by Terminal Power Company
 "Cyclops", a song from Portrait of an American Family by Marilyn Manson
 "Cyclops", a song from The Libertines by The Libertines

Other
 The Cyclops (Redon), an 1898 painting by Odilon Redon
 Cyclops (roller coaster), at Mt. Olympus Theme Park, Wisconsin, U.S.

Science and technology
 Cromemco Cyclops, first commercial all-digital camera using a digital MOS area image sensor
 Cyclops (computer system), an automated line-calling system in tennis
 Cyclops (copepod), a genus of copepods (crustaceans)
 Cyclops laser, a high-power laser built in 1975
 Cyclops (rock), a type of agate
 Project Cyclops, a NASA proposal for an Earth-based radio telescope array

In the military
 , four ships of the Royal Navy
 Cyclops-class monitor, four Royal Navy monitors built in the 1870s
 , two ships of the United States Navy
 Huff-Daland XHB-1, an American 1920s prototype heavy bomber nicknamed "Cyclops"
 Cyclops Airfield, an American World War II airfield in Papua - see Sentani International Airport

Transportation
 , a British cargo steamship
 Cyclops, a West Cornwall Railway steam locomotive
 Cyclops, a nickname for DM 556, an NZR DM class unit on the rail passenger network of Wellington, New Zealand
 Cyclops, a nickname for the British Rail Class 67 Locomotive

Businesses
 Cyclops Steel, a former steel company based in Pittsburgh, Pennsylvania, United States
 Cyclops (company), a UK provider of consumer speed camera alert systems
 Cyclops (toy company), an Australian manufacturer of toys

Places
 Cyclops Mountains, New Guinea
 Cyclops Peak, Enderby Land, Antarctica

Other uses
 SouthWest Cyclops, a Canadian professional indoor lacrosse team
 Cyclops, a Ku Klux Klan position title
 A CYCLOPS junction, a certain kind of protected intersection

See also
 Cyclops64, an IBM supercomputer architecture
 Cyclopes (disambiguation)
 Cyclopia, a birth defect
 Cyclopsitta, a genus of parrot
 List of one-eyed creatures in mythology and fiction